Oscar Franklin Smith (born March 25, 1950) is an American man convicted of capital murder in Tennessee and sentenced to death. Smith has maintained innocence and was scheduled to be executed on April 21, 2022, however, his execution was temporarily reprieved by Governor Bill Lee due to an oversight in the preparation for lethal injection.

Crime
On October 1, 1989, Smith's estranged wife, Judy Robird Smith, and her sons Chad Burnett and Jason Burnett were murdered in Nashville, Tennessee. Judy was shot in the neck and stabbed several times. Chad was shot in the left eye, upper chest, and left torso. Jason was stabbed in the neck and abdomen. An awl was recovered at the scene, but the gun and knife were never recovered.

At the time of the incident, Smith was separated from his wife. He had also taken out an insurance policy on all three of the victims. The couple had three-year-old twins. Smith's coworkers claimed that he had threatened to kill Judy on at least twelve occasions between June and August 1989. One coworker stated that Smith threatened to kill Chad and Jason because he thought Judy treated them better than the twins. During the murders, the family tried to call the police, and Chad could be heard screaming "Frank, no!"

Legal proceedings
At trial, crime scene investigators testified they found a bloody palm print on the sheet next to Judy Smith's body that was missing the same two fingers Oscar Smith is missing. Later, Smith hired a fingerprint expert who called this evidence into question and claimed that the investigator made numerous errors and could not have definitively identified the print.

On July 26, 1990, Smith was sentenced to death by a jury in Davidson County.

Post-conviction
Smith is one of dozens of death row inmates who joined a lawsuit arguing that lethal injection amounts to state-sanctioned torture, and that the injection creates the sensation of drowning and burning alive.

Smith was scheduled to be executed in June 2020 and February 2021, but the dates were postponed due to the COVID-19 pandemic. Smith was then scheduled to be executed on April 21, 2022.

In March 2022, Smith's attorneys at the law firm Baker Botts filed a clemency petition to Tennessee Governor Bill Lee arguing that Smith's sentence should be commuted to life without parole.

In April 2022, Smith filed a motion to reopen his case due to new DNA evidence found on a murder weapon. His lawyer, public defender Amy D. Harwell, said that "DNA evidence shows that an unknown assailant, not Mr. Smith, used the bloody murder weapon found at the crime scene to murder Mr. Smith's family." Smith argues that he could not have presented the DNA evidence any sooner because the technology used to analyze the weapon is new. An investigator's fingerprint was also found on the awl. On April 11, 2022, a Tennessee court declined to reopen his case.

On April 14, 2022, Smith asked the Tennessee Supreme Court to vacate his execution date. On April 18, 2022, the Tennessee Supreme Court declined to hear Smith's appeal and denied his request to vacate his execution date. On April 19, 2022, Tennessee's governor said that he would not intervene in Smith's execution. On April 21, 2022, his execution was reprieved due to an oversight in the preparation for lethal injection. Governor Bill Lee issued the temporary reprieve and said, "Due to an oversight in preparation for lethal injection, the scheduled execution of Oscar Smith will not move forward tonight. I am granting a temporary reprieve while we address Tennessee Department of Correction protocol. Further details will be released when available."

On May 2, 2022, Lee announced that on the day of Smith's scheduled execution he became aware that the proper procedure for preparing lethal injection had not been followed correctly. The procedure, which involves testing for endotoxins, had not been properly followed. The chemicals in the lethal injection had only been tested for potency and sterility but not for endotoxins. Because of this, he suspended all executions in Tennessee for the remainder of the year and ordered a third-party review of the lethal injection process.

See also
 List of death row inmates in the United States
 List of people scheduled to be executed in the United States

References

1950 births
1989 murders in the United States
American people convicted of murder
American prisoners sentenced to death
Criminals from Tennessee
Living people
People convicted of murder by Tennessee
Prisoners sentenced to death by Tennessee
1989 in Tennessee
20th-century American criminals